A.M. is the fourth studio album by American country music artist Chris Young. It was released on September 17, 2013, via RCA Nashville. Young co-wrote six of the album's eleven tracks. The album includes the singles "Aw Naw", "Who I Am with You" and "Lonely Eyes".

Critical reception

A.M. garnered generally positive reception by music critics. At AllMusic, Stephen Thomas Erlewine told that the release was "steeped in modern vernacular," and showed Young "brightening up his sound by leaning on cheerful, chipper pop hooks and a production so gleaming it shows his reflection; he has even chosen to smile on his album cover for the first time ever." Lee Zimmerman of American Songwriter wrote that "In the hands of a wannabe, the aforementioned songs might sound somewhat cloying, but given Young’s rugged vocals and apparent reservoir of conviction, the emotions ring true." At Entertainment Weekly, they felt that Young "survives on his fourth album, but too often he falls into the "bro country" trap currently plaguing the genre." Bob Paxman at Country Weekly stated that it "disproves the popular belief that nothing good ever happens in the a.m. There’s plenty of good stuff here." At Roughstock, Matt Bjorke said that "Everything about A.M. screams star-making and with a hard core collection of fans who already help him headline venues across The USA, Chris Young's only destined for bigger things because of A.M.." In 2017, Billboard contributor Chuck Dauphin placed "Lonely Eyes" at number 4 on his top 10 list of Young's best songs.

Track listing

Personnel
The following list is adapted from the A.M. liner notes.
Shannon Forrest – drums
Paul Franklin – steel guitar
Kenny Greenberg – electric guitar
Tony Harrell – Hammond B-3 organ, keyboards, piano
Aubrey Haynie – fiddle, mandolin
Wes Hightower – background vocals
Mark Hill – bass guitar
Brent Mason – electric guitar
Steve Nathan – Hammond B-3 organ, keyboards, piano, Wurlitzer
Biff Watson – acoustic guitar
Chris Young – lead vocals

Chart performance
The album debuted at No. 2 on the Top Country Albums chart, and No. 3 at  Billboard 200 with 53,000 copies sold. The album has sold 267,000 copies in the US as of October 2015.

Weekly charts

Year-end charts

Singles

Certifications

References

2013 albums
Chris Young (musician) albums
RCA Records albums
Albums produced by James Stroud